Uttar Gujarat Vij Company Ltd. is an electricity company that was incorporated on 15 September 2003 by Gujarat Electricity Board (GEB). The Company obtained the Certificate of the Commencement of Business on 15 October 2003. The company was one of several created as a part of efforts towards restructuring of the power sector in the state of Gujarat in India.

Description
The company is involved in electricity sub-transmission distribution and retail supply in the State of Gujarat or outside the State. Their mandate is to establish and use a power system network and to buy and sell electrical energy, and to collect information with an eye towards further system improvements.

The Gujarat Electricity Industry (Re-Organization & Regulation) Act 2003 paved the way for comprehensive reform and restructuring of the State Electricity Board with an aim to restructure the Electricity Industry in a manner that will ensure the long term viability and sustainability of the power sector in the state. As a part of the reform process, the GEB was disaggregated into several autonomous entities.

The Electricity Act 2003 introduced competition by way of open access in the transmission and distribution of electricity. The Act also provided for reorganization of the Electricity Boards through appropriate transfer schemes being formulated by the state governments. The Government of Gujarat reorganized the GEB functionally into a Generation Company, a Transmission Company and four Distribution Companies. Thereby Uttar Gujarat Vij Company Limited became functional on 1 April 2005.

Achievements
2016 - UGVCL wins CBIP Award

2016 - UGVCL wins India Power Award 2016

2016 - UGVCL wins National Award for Excellence in Cost Mgmt. 2016

2015 - UGVCL outshines in ENERSIA 2015

2015 - UGVCL wins IPPAI Award 2015

2014 - UGVCL receives ISO 9001:2008 re-certification till 2017

2014 - UGVCL wins India Power Award-2014

2014 - UGVCL gets IUKAN Award

2013 - UGVCL - one of the India's Greenest DISCOM

2013 - UGVCL India's second best rated DISCOM

2012 - UGVCL wins India Power Award - 2012

2012 - UGVCL wins POWER LINE Award - 2012

2012 - UGVCL receives Gold Shield for the year 2010-11

2012 - UGVCL receives ISO 9001:2008 re-certification in 2012

2010 - Winner of 3rd India Power Awards 2010…..

2010 - Winner of ICWAI – Good Performance Awards……

2010 - Upgraded ISO 9001:2008 Certification in 2010 for 'Management and Performance       Enhancement of Electricity Distribution Operations'

2009 - Winner of 2nd 'India Power Awards 2009' in recognition for overall utility performance in agriculture dominated area

2009 - First Prize 'Excellence in Rural Electrification ' in IEEMA Power Awards-2008

2008 - UGVCL receives ISO 9001:2000 Certification...

2007 - ISO/IEC 17025:2005 by NABL for its Hi-Tech Meter Testing Laboratory at Sabarmati, Ahmedabad

2007 - National Award for 'Excellence in Cost Management 2007' by ICWAI

2007 -  Bronze Shield for 'Meritorious Performance in Electricity Distribution' during 2005-06 by Government of India

2005 - Completion of Jyoti Gram Yojna, an ambitious project of Govt. of Gujarat

2005 - Pioneer Company for Special Design Transformers

See also
 Gujarat State Electricity Corporation Limited GSEC
 Gujarat Energy Transmission Corporation limited Getco
 State Load Dispatch CenterSLDC
 Dakshin Gujarat Vij Company Limited DGVCL
 Madhya Gujarat Vij Company Limited MGVCL
 Paschim Gujarat Vij Company Limited PGVCL
 Uttar Gujarat Vij Company Limited UGVCL
 Gujarat Energy Training and Research Institute GETRI

References

External links
 

Recruitment for Vidyut Sahayak (Junior Assistant) Posts 2019-20

Electric power distribution network operators in India
Energy companies established in 1999
State electricity agencies of Gujarat
1999 establishments in Gujarat